Sir John William Simpson KBE FRIBA (9 August 1858 – 30 March 1933) was a British architect and President of the Royal Institute of British Architects from 1919 to 1921.

Background and early life 

Simpson was the eldest son of the Brighton architect Thomas Simpson and his wife Clara Hart.  He was the brother of another architect, Gilbert Murray Simpson.

He was educated privately and articled to his father in 1875, but later attended the Royal Academy Schools.

Career 

Simpson became an Associate of the Royal Institute of British Architects in 1882.  He was in partnership with M. P. Manning from 1881 to 1884 and subsequently with E. J. Milner Allen, specializing in public buildings.

He was an active member of the Royal Institute of British Architects, rising to be its President, and of a number of architectural associations in other countries.  He also wrote books and articles on architecture.

In 1905, he was joined in his practice by the young Maxwell Ayrton, and they entered into a partnership in 1910.

He never married, and died at home in West Hill, Highgate, Middlesex, on 30 March 1933.

Publications 
 Introduction to Sir Lawrence Weaver's Architectural Copyright (1911)
 Essays and Memorials (1923)
 Paris Rosemary (1927)
 Some Account of the Old Hall of Lincoln's Inn (1928)
 The Architecture of the Renaissance in France by W. H. Ward (second edition, ed. J. W. Simpson, 1926)

Simpson wrote many professional papers on architecture and town planning. He edited the periodical The Book of Book-Plates between 1900 and 1903.

Memberships and appointments 
 Secretary-general of the London Town Planning Conference, 1910
 Member of Council of the British School at Rome
 Corresponding member of the Institut de France
 Member of the Sociedad Central de Arquitectos, Buenos Aires
 Member of the Centralvereinigung der Architekten, Vienna

Honours 
 Fellow of the Royal Institute of British Architects, 1900
 President of the Royal Institute of British Architects, 1919
 Gold medal of the Société des Artistes Français, 1922
 President of the Union Franco-Britannique des Architectes, 1922
 Knight Commander of the Order of the British Empire, 1924
Chevalier of the Légion d'honneur

Major works

Wembley Stadium (with Maxwell Ayrton)
Victoria Institute, Worcester (1896) (collaboration)
Offices of the Crown Agents for the Colonies at 4 Millbank (1914–16)
West Downs School, Winchester (1897–98)
Roedean School (1898–99, 1906, 1908, 1911)
New school buildings at Gresham's School (completed 1903)
Restoration of the Old Hall of Lincoln's Inn, London
Kelvingrove Art Gallery and Museum (with E.J. Milner Allen)
New buildings for Lancing College
New buildings for Haileybury College (now called Haileybury and Imperial Service College)
Queen Victoria memorial at Bradford
Royal Sussex Regiment memorial at Regency Square, Brighton
Onslow Ford memorial in St John's Wood
Cartwright Memorial Hall at Bradford
Brighton War Memorial, Old Steine, Brighton
Palace of Industry, Palace of Engineering and Stadium at British Empire Exhibition, Wembley, 1924 (with Maxwell Ayrton)
Grafton Street Hospital, Liverpool (collaboration)
National Hospital for the Paralysed and Epileptic, Queen Square, London (collaboration)
Glasgow Art Galleries for the Corporation of Glasgow (collaboration)

References 

 Simpson, Sir John William (1858–1933), architect by W. G. Allen and John Elliott in Oxford Dictionary of National Biography (2004)
 Sir John William Simpson by R. Unwinetal, RIBA Journal, volume 40 (1932–33), pages 514–15 and 517
 The Builder, volume 144 (1933), pages 568-573 and 614
 Obituary, The Times, 1 April 1933
John William Simpson's entry at www.scottisharchitects.org.uk

Architects from Sussex
1858 births
1933 deaths
Alumni of the Royal College of Art
Chevaliers of the Légion d'honneur
Associates of the Royal Institute of British Architects
Fellows of the Royal Institute of British Architects
Knights Commander of the Order of the British Empire
Presidents of the Royal Institute of British Architects